"Naggin'" is a song by American hip hop group Ying Yang Twins. It is the debut single from their third studio album Me & My Brother (2003) and was produced by Mr. Collipark.

On Me and My Brothers, the song is followed by a remix titled "Naggin' Part II (The Answer)", performed by Ms. Flawless and Tha Rhythum.

Critical reception
Writing for AllMusic, Alex Henderson described the song as one of the "straight-up club-bangers" from Me and My Brothers. Gil Kaufman of Rolling Stone criticized the song along with the previous tracks of the album for misogyny, and described it as a "gripefest about women".

Charts

References

2003 singles
2003 songs
Ying Yang Twins songs
Songs written by Mr. Collipark
TVT Records singles